Benalla Art Gallery is a public art gallery in the regional town of Benalla, Victoria, Australia.

The Benalla Art Gallery is a free, public gallery in Benalla, which opened in 1975. Victoria's Herald Sun newspaper described it in 2013 as one of Victoria's top ten regional galleries, with a "striking modernist building". The gallery complex was designed by Colin Munro and Philip Sargeant. The gallery's original design was reduced in size, culminating in an expansion proposal being canvassed in 2013.

In 2013 a new art prize was announced for a work of the naked human figure. The winner of the non-acquisitive $50,000 2014 Benalla Nude Art Prize for 2014 was Juan Davila.  Artists whose work is held by the Benalla Art Gallery include Constance Stokes and Jan Hendrik Scheltema.

The gallery is a member of the Public Galleries Association of Victoria.

References

External links
 Benalla Art Gallery website

Art museums and galleries in Victoria (Australia)